Judith Viorst (née Stahl, February 2, 1931) is an American writer, newspaper journalist, and psychoanalysis researcher. 
She is known for her humorous observational poetry and for her children's literature. This includes The Tenth Good Thing About Barney (about the death of a pet) and the Alexander series of short picture books, which includes Alexander and the Terrible, Horrible, No Good, Very Bad Day (1972), which has sold over two million copies.

Viorst is a 1952 graduate of the Newark College of Arts and Sciences at Rutgers University in Newark, New Jersey. In 1968, Viorst signed the "Writers and Editors War Tax Protest" pledge, vowing to refuse tax payments in protest against the Vietnam War. In the latter part of the 1970s, after two decades of writing for children and adults, she turned to the study of Freudian psychology. In 1981, she became a research graduate at Washington Psychoanalytic Institute after six years of study.

Personal life
A native of Newark, New Jersey, Viorst was raised in Maplewood, New Jersey, and attended Columbia High School. A graduate of the class of 1948, Viorst was inducted into the school's hall of fame in 1990.

She currently lives in Washington, D.C., with her husband, political writer Milton Viorst. They have three grown sons: Anthony Jacob Viorst, an attorney practicing in the Denver, Colorado, area; Nicholas Nathan "Nick" Viorst, an Assistant District Attorney for New York County, and Alexander Noah Viorst, who finances affordable apartment properties around the country.

She received the 2011 Foremother Award for Lifetime Achievement from the National Research Center for Women & Families.

Writing

Writing for children
Among Viorst's books for children is the "Alexander" series (including Alexander and the Terrible, Horrible, No Good, Very Bad Day), whose narrator is a 5-year-old boy who lives with his parents and two brothers, Anthony and Nick, who are named for Viorst's own three sons.

Viorst's book Sad Underwear is a collection of poems that examines a wide variety of feelings and experiences from a child's point of view.

Writing for adults
Viorst's books for adults include nonfiction psychology books such as Grown-up Marriage, Imperfect Control, and Necessary Losses. She has written nine books of poetry including Unexpectedly Eighty and Other Adaptations, When Did I Stop Being Twenty and Other Injustices: Selected Poems from Single to Mid-Life and People and other Aggravations. Viorst is also a newspaper columnist and has written frequently for The New York Times and The Washington Post, and has been a contributing editor to Redbook magazine.

She also penned the musical Love & Shrimp with Shelly Markam. The Ensemble Theatre of Cincinnati hosted a performance of Love & Shrimp, starring Deb Girdler, Pamela Myers and Shelley Bamberger, in the spring of 1999.

Selected works

 The Wonderful World of Science, edited by Shirley Moore and Viorst (Bantam Books, 1961) — science experiments and recreations
 Projects: Space (Washington Square Books, 1962) 
 150 Science Experiments Step-by-step, illus. Dennis Telesford (Bantam, 1963)  
 The Natural World: A guide to North American wildlife (Bantam, 1965)  
 The Village Square, illus. Tom Ballenger (Coward-McCann, 1966)   
 The Changing Earth, illus. Feodor Rimsky (Bantam, 1967)  
 Sunday Morning: a story, illus. Hilary Knight (Harper & Row, 1968)

For children
 I'll Fix Anthony, illus. Arnold Lobel (1969), Harper & Row, 
 Try It Again, Sam: Safety When You Walk, illus. Paul Galdone (1970)
 My Mama Says there Aren't any Zombies, Ghosts, Vampires, Creatures, Demons, Monsters, Fiends, Goblins, or Things, illus. Kay Chorao (1973)
 The Tenth Good Thing About Barney, illus. Erik Blegvad (1987)
 The Good-bye Book, illus. Kay Chorao (1988)
 Super-Completely and Totally the Messiest, illus.  Robin Preiss Glasser (2001)
 Just in Case, illus. Diana Cain Bluthenthal (2006)
 And Two Boys Booed, illus. Sophie Blackall (2014)

Poems for Children and Their Parents
 If I Were in Charge of the World and Other Worries: Poems for Children and their Parents, illus. Lynne Cherry (1981)
 Sad Underwear and Other Complications: More Poems for Children and Their Parents, illus. Richard Hull (1995)

Alexander 
 Alexander and the Terrible, Horrible, No Good, Very Bad Day, illustrated by Ray Cruz (1972), New York: Atheneum Books, 
 Alexander, Who Used to be Rich Last Sunday illus. Ray Cruz (1977), Atheneum, 
 Alexander, Who Is Not (Do You Hear Me? I Mean It!) Going to Move illus. Robin Preiss Glasser "in the style of Ray Cruz" (1995), Atheneum, 
 Alexander, Who's Trying His Best to Be the Best Boy Ever illus. Isidre Monés "in the style of Ray Cruz" (2014), Atheneum, 
Omnibus edition: Absolutely, Positively Alexander: The Complete Stories

Related titles
 Alexander and the Terrible, Horrible, No Good, Very Bad Day: A Musical
 Alexander and the Wonderful, Marvelous, Excellent, Terrific Ninety Days: An Almost Completely Honest Account of What Happened to Our Family When Our Youngest came to Live with Us for Three Months (2007) — an adult memoir of Judith Viorst and her real son, Alexander

Lulu 
 Lulu and the Brontosaurus, illus. Lane Smith (2010), Atheneum, 
 Lulu Walks the Dogs, illus. Lane Smith (2012), Atheneum, 
 Lulu's Mysterious Mission, illus. Kevin Cornell (2014), Atheneum, 
 Lulu Is Getting a Sister, illus. Kevin Cornell (2018), Atheneum,

For adults
 People and Other Aggravations (1971)
 Yes, Married: A Saga of Love and Complaint (1972)
 A Visit from St. Nicholas to a Liberated Household illustrated by Norman Green (1977)
 Love and Guilt and the Meaning of Life, Etc. illustrated by John Alcorn (1979)
 Necessary Losses: The Loves, Illusions, Dependencies, and Impossible Expectations That All of Us Have to Give Up in Order to Grow (1987)
 Murdering Mr. Monti: A Merry Little Tale of Sex and Violence (1994)
 Imperfect Control: Our Lifelong Struggles With Power and Surrender (1998)
 You're Officially a Grown-up: The Graduate's Guide to Freedom, Responsibility, Happiness, and Personal Hygiene (1999)
 Grown-Up Marriage: What We Know, Wish We Had Known, and Still Need to Know About Being Married (2003)

Age-related poetry series
 When Did I Stop Being 20 & Other Injustices: Selected Poems from Single to Mid-Life, illus. John Alcorn (1987)
 It's Hard to Be Hip Over 30 & Other Tragedies of Married Life (1968), New York: World Publ. Co.; reprinted by Persephone Books, 1999
 How Did I Get to Be 40 & Other Atrocities illus. John Alcorn (1976)
 Forever 50 & Other Negotiations, illus. John Alcorn (1989)
 Suddenly 60 & Other Shocks of Later Life, illus. Laurie Rosewald (2000)
 I'm Too Young to Be 70 & Other Delusions, illustrated by Laura Gibson (2005)
 Unexpectedly 80 & Other Adaptations, illus. Laura Gibson (2010)
 Nearing 90 And Other Comedies of Late Life, illus. Laura Gibson (2019)

Dramatic adaptations 
Alexander and the Terrible, Horrible, No Good, Very Bad Day, a stage adaptation of the book, was performed at the B Street Theatre in 2004.
Alexander and the Terrible, Horrible, No Good, Very Bad Day, live-action film by Walt Disney Pictures, 2014. http://movies.disney.com/alexander-and-the-terrible-horrible-no-good-very-bad-day/

References

External links 

 Holt Books: Author biography
 It's Hard to Be Hip Over Thirty profile at Persephone Books
  on her education at Rutgers University and her subsequent career
 
 How to Stay Happily Married
 

1931 births
Living people
American children's writers
American psychology writers
American tax resisters
Primetime Emmy Award winners
Writers from Washington, D.C.
American columnists
Rutgers University alumni
American women columnists
American women children's writers
Women science writers
20th-century American non-fiction writers
20th-century American women writers
21st-century American non-fiction writers
21st-century American women writers
Children's poets
Columbia High School (New Jersey) alumni
People from Maplewood, New Jersey
Writers from Newark, New Jersey
American women non-fiction writers